Nabonga is a 1944 PRC film starring Buster Crabbe and Julie London (in her film debut). It was retitled Jungle Woman in the British Empire.

Plot 
T. F. Stockwell (Herbert Rawlinson) steals the money and jewelry contents of safe deposit boxes of the Cairo bank in which he works.  After fleeing south in a private plane with his young daughter Doreen (Jackie Newfield) and the pilot, they're brought down in the jungle during a storm. The three survive the crash but Stockwell murders the pilot when he sees the stolen loot. Whilst exploring the surroundings, Doreen finds a gorilla (Ray Corrigan) wounded and left for dead by members of a safari.

Years pass when Ray Gorman (Buster Crabbe) comes to the area on the fringes of the jungle where the plane crashed.  Bar owner Carl Hurst (Barton MacLane) and his female associate Marie (Fifi D'Orsay) spy on Gorman to see what he's up to.

Gorman's father was head of the bank that Stockwell worked for and robbed; when Gorman's father was blamed for the theft he committed suicide.  Gorman is out to recover the loot from the plane crash to clear his father's name.  When Gorman saves Hurst's servant Tobo (Prince Modupe) from being murdered by another African (Fred Toones), Tobo confides in Gorman that there is a white witch in the jungle who legend has it came from the sky.  Gorman realises that this could be a reference to Stockwell's plane crash and disappearance. Tobo offers to lead Gorman to the area whilst Hurst and Marie secretly follow.

The "white witch" is the grown up Doreen (Julie London) living with her gorilla named Samson who protects her; her father having long ago disappeared in the jungle.

Cast

Main
 Buster Crabbe as Ray Gorman
 Julie London as Doreen Stockwell
 Barton MacLane as Carl Hurst
 Fifi D'Orsay as Marie
 Bryant Washburn as White Hunter
 Herbert Rawlinson as T.F. Stockwell

Supporting
 Prince Modupe as Tobo
 Jackie Newfield as Doreen Stockwell, as a child
 Ray Corrigan as Samson the Gorilla (as Nbongo)

Cameo/Uncredited
 Jack Gardner as Pilot
 I. Stanford Jolley as Policeman 
 Edmund Mortimer as Trader
 Fred 'Snowflake' Toones as Native Attacking Tobo

Production
Guinea born Prince Modupe according to his autobiography I Was a Savage/Royal African was a Hollywood technical advisor on African films  such as Sundown  and The Snows of Kilimanjaro.  He gives not only a highly sympathetic portrayal of an African, but one who is a friend rather than a servant of Crabbe.  In addition to fighting men and a crocodile, Crabbe displays amusing Bob Hope type comedy when frightened by Julie London's killer gorilla.

References

External links

 
 
 

1944 films
1944 adventure films
American black-and-white films
Producers Releasing Corporation films
Jungle girls
Films set in Africa
American adventure films
Films directed by Sam Newfield
1940s American films